William Bradford Turner Hastings (December 13, 1919 - December 2, 1992) was suffragan bishop of the Episcopal Diocese of Connecticut from his election in 1981 until his retirement in 1986.

Early life and education
Hastings was born on December 13, 1919, in Garden City, New York, the son of the Reverend Alfred Abbott Hastings and Dorothy Quincy Turner. He was educated at the Trinity-Pawling School, before studying at the Union College from where he graduated with a Bachelor of Arts in 1941. On July 31, 1942, he married Virginia Floyd and together had four children. He then enrolled at the Virginia Theological Seminary from where he earned his Bachelor of Divinity in 1943.

Ordained Ministry
Hastings was ordained deacon on September 26, 1943, in St Paul's Church, Troy, New York, by Bishop G. Ashton Oldham of Albany. He was then ordained priest in March 1944 by Bishop William Scarlett of Missouri. Between 1943 and 1946 he served as rector of St Paul's Church in Overland, Missouri. In 1946 he became rector of Trinity Church in Concord, Massachusetts. He then moved to Minnesota to become rector of Christ Church in Saint Paul, Minnesota and in 1954, he became rector of St Luke's Church in Minneapolis, Minnesota. In 1959 he became rector of All Saints Church in Worcester, Massachusetts. Between 1965 and 1981, he served as rector of Christ Church in Greenwich, Connecticut.

Episcopacy
On May 16, 1981, Hastings was elected Suffragan Bishop of Connecticut during a special convention at Christ Church in Hartford, Connecticut. He was consecrated on October 23, 1981, in Roman Catholic Cathedral of St Joseph by Presiding Bishop John Allin. He retired in 1986.

References 

1919 births
1992 deaths
Episcopal Church in Connecticut
20th-century American Episcopalians
Episcopal bishops of Connecticut
20th-century American clergy